Bijelo Polje is a town in northeastern Montenegro on the Lim River. It has an urban population of 12,900 (2011 census). It is the administrative, economic, cultural and educational centre of northern Montenegro.

Bijelo Polje is the center of Bijelo Polje Municipality (population of 46,051). It is the unofficial center of the north-eastern region of Montenegro. Bijelo Polje means 'white field' in Serbo-Croatian.

History

Bijelo Polje's Saint Peter and Paul Church is the place where the UNESCO Miroslav's Gospel of Miroslav, brother of Serbian ruler Stefan Nemanja was written.

During World War II, Bijelo Pole was a prominent location for the anti-fascist resistance movement in Yugoslavia, Montenegro in particular.

Demographics
Bijelo Polje is the administrative centre of the Bijelo Polje municipality, which in 2011 had a population of 46,251. The town of Bijelo Polje itself has 12,900 citizens.
 
Town

Municipality

Ethnicity
Source: Statistical Office of Montenegro - MONSTAT, Census 2011

Religion
Source: Statistical Office of Montenegro - MONSTAT, Census 2011

Culture and sights

Bijelo Polje was the birthplace of the oral poet Avdo Međedović and of many prominent writers such as Ćamil Sijarić, Miodrag Bulatović, Risto Ratković and Dragomir Brajković as well as basketball player Nikola Peković and Swedish footballing brothers Ajsel and Emir Kujović.

Sports

The major football team is Jedinstvo, who have spent several seasons in the country's top tier. They share their Gradski stadion with lower league team OFK Borac. The town's basketball teams are Jedinstvo and KK Centar.

Transport

Bijelo Polje is connected to the rest of Montenegro by two major roads. It is situated on the main road connecting Montenegro's coast and Podgorica with northern Montenegro and Serbia (E65, E80).

Bijelo Polje is also a station on Belgrade–Bar railway, the last station in Montenegro for trains leaving for Belgrade, and it serves as a regional train station.

Climate
Bijelo Polje has a humid continental climate (Köppen: Dfb) with warm summers, cold winters, and abundant precipitation year round.

Notable people 

 Avdo Međedović, guslar
 Miodrag Bulatović, writer
 Ćamil Sijarić, writer
 Dragomir Brajković, writer
 Risto Ratković, writer
 Nastasja Vojinović, musician
 Milutin Karadžić, actor
 Ajsel Kujović, footballer
 Emir Kujović, footballer
 Duško Ivanović, basketball coach
 Nikola Peković, basketball player
 Predrag Drobnjak, basketball player
 Suad Šehović, basketball player
 Sead Šehović, basketball player

International relations

Twin towns — sister cities
Bijelo Polje is twinned with:

 Bila Tserkva, Ukraine
 Burhaniye, Turkey
 Hrubieszów, Poland
 Maardu, Estonia
 Strumica, North Macedonia
 Svishtov, Bulgaria

References

External links

 Visit-Montenegro.com
 Census info, njegos.org; accessed 12 August 2015.

 
Populated places in Bijelo Polje Municipality
Sandžak